The term ordered list can refer to:
 an ordered list (HTML)
 a mathematical sequence